José de Carvalho Filho (born 15 November 1931) is a Brazilian rower. He competed in the men's coxed four event at the 1956 Summer Olympics.

References

External links
 

1931 births
Possibly living people
Brazilian male rowers
Olympic rowers of Brazil
Rowers at the 1956 Summer Olympics
Rowers from Rio de Janeiro (city)